Cleaton is an unincorporated community located in Muhlenberg County, Kentucky, United States.

Demographics

History
A post office called Cleaton has been in operation since 1901. The name Cleaton was the middle name of the wife of the postmaster.

References

Unincorporated communities in Muhlenberg County, Kentucky
Unincorporated communities in Kentucky